The Youngstown Nighthawks are an American Semi professional indoor soccer franchise based in Youngstown, Ohio. Founded in November 2014, the team debuted in the 2015–16 season.

The Nighthawks are owned by Edward Holmes, and Chris Harrold serves as general manager. The head coach is Ohio-native Allen Eller. The team plans to play its home games at the Covelli Centre.  The team was rebuffed by the MASL, and since then, the team has been holding open tryouts to build its roster, participated in tournaments to hone skills, and organized community events for goodwill and publicity.  They compete in the Premier Arena Soccer League. The Nighthawks began playing a series of exhibition games in June 2015.

References

External links
Youngstown Nighthawks official website
Major Arena Soccer League official website

2014 establishments in Ohio
Association football clubs established in 2014
Indoor soccer clubs in the United States
Major Arena Soccer League teams
Soccer clubs in Ohio
Nighthawks